Sachiko Matsubara (Japanese: 松原 幸子; born 1973), better known by her stage name Sachiko M, is a Japanese musician. Her first solo album, Sine Wave Solo, was released in 1999. Working in collaboration with Ami Yoshida under the name Cosmos in 2002, Sachiko released the two disc album Astro Twin/Cosmos (2) which was awarded the Golden Nica prize in Ars Electronica, 2003. She released Good Morning Good Night, a collaborative album with Otomo Yoshihide and Toshimaru Nakamura, in 2004.

Selected Discography
 Filament 1 (1998) with Otomo Yoshihide
 Un (1998) with Toshimaru Nakamura
 Four Focuses (1999) with Martin Tétreault, Yasuhiro Otani, and Otomo Yoshihide
 Filament 2 (Secret Recordings 2) (1999) with Günter Müller and Otomo Yoshihide
 Sine Wave Solo (1999)
 Do (2001) with Toshimaru Nakamura
 Tears with Ami Yoshida as Cosmos (2002)  
 Les Hautes Solitudes - A Philippe Garrel Film: Imaginary Soundtrack (2002) with Otomo Yoshihide and Taku Sugimoto
 Artefact (2002) with Philip Samartzis
 Good Morning Good Night (2004) with Otomo Yoshihide and Toshimaru Nakamura
 Manafon (2009) with David Sylvian

Bibliography
 Where We Are (Bccks, 2012)
 Sachiko M Sound Installation: I'm Here: Shortstay (Bccks, 2013)
 All About Sachiko M: Intro (Bccks, 2013)

References

External links
 
 

Free improvisation
Electroacoustic improvisation
Japanese experimental musicians
Living people
Place of birth missing (living people)
Japanese women in electronic music
Japanese electronic musicians
1973 births